The California Interscholastic Federation (CIF) is the governing body for high school sports in the U.S. state of California. CIF membership includes both public and private high schools. Unlike most other state organizations, it does not have a single, statewide championships for all sports; instead, for some sports, the CIF's 10 Sections each have their own championships.

Six schools near the state border are members of adjacent state's associations.  San Pasqual Valley High School is part of the Arizona Interscholastic Association.  Coleville High School, Needles High School, North Tahoe High School, South Tahoe High School and Truckee High School are part of the Nevada Interscholastic Activities Association.

History
As early as 1891, schools around the San Francisco Bay Area began competing against each other in football organized by the Amateur Academic Athletic Association.  Other boys sports were added starting 1894, organized by the Academic Athletic League.  While teams represented the schools by name, there was no affiliation with the school administration.

The CIF was founded in Los Angeles in 1914 by a group of area school principals. It was founded in order to standardize rules and team structures between schools; it was also intended to prevent abuses such as "school shopping" by athletes and teams fielding players over high school age. Other school principals voluntarily entered into the program, and by 1917, the organization was established statewide.

In 2005, CIF began requiring that all student athletes sign a pledge not to take any steroids or face suspension or expulsion. This action was the first of its kind from a statewide high school athletics association in the United States.

Championships
CIF holds state and regional championships in:
 badminton
 boys' and girls' basketball; California high school basketball championship
 boys' and girls' tennis
 boys' and girls' cross country
 football; List of California state high school football champions
 boys' and girls' golf
 boys' and girls' swimming and diving
 boys' and girls' soccer
 boys' and girls' track and field; the CIF California State Meet
 boys' and girls' tennis
 boys' and girls' volleyball
 boys' and girls' water polo
 boys' and girls' wrestling
CIF also hosts a State Cheerleading Championship in conjunction with the football championship.

Individual CIF sections also conduct championships in other sports, including:
 field hockey
 boys' and girls' lacrosse
 roller hockey

In sports where a school has separate boys' and girls' teams, girls are not allowed on boys' teams, and boys are not allowed on girls' teams. (In sports such as baseball that do not have girls' teams, girls are allowed to play; on the other hand, in sports such as softball that do not have boys' teams, in most cases boys are not allowed to play.)

Participants
In the 2016-17 season, the California Interscholastic Federation featured 800,364 participants, with 58% boys and 42% girls.

The sports with most boys are:
 American football: 97,079
 Track and field: 56,032
 Soccer: 52,795
 Basketball: 46,114
 Baseball: 43,913
 Cross country athletics: 31,830
 Wrestling: 22,383
 Swimming: 21,467

The sports with most girls are:
 Soccer: 47,139
 Track and field: 46,276
 Volleyball: 44,526
 Basketball: 34,222
 Softball: 33,265
 Swimming: 29,722
 Cross country athletics: 25,600

Awards
CIF offers various awards to its participants:
Academic State Champions, given to the teams with high academic achievement
Model Coach Award, for coaches who are positive role models
Scholar-Athlete of the Year, based on academic and athletic excellence, and character
Spirit of Sport, based on sportsmanship, community service, and leadership

Administration

Sections

The state is broken up into ten administrative sections. These sections are:

Each section except for San Francisco and Oakland is further subdivided into leagues. The Northern Section is divided into three conferences which in turn are divided into leagues.

The Southern Section is the largest by both membership and geography, covering just under one-third of the state's total area and almost half of the population base. The Southern section includes private schools in the LAUSD service area, whether inside or outside the city of Los Angeles, and the Central Coast and North Coast sections also include private schools in the cities of San Francisco and Oakland respectively. The three "City Sections" are operated by and were historically limited to the corresponding public school systems. With the advent of charter schools in California, all three City Sections include both traditional public schools and charter schools operating within the historic boundaries of the respective public school systems. The San Francisco Section now includes one private school as well.

The sections also serve as the qualifying entities for regional and state competitions, and may organize championships in sports not contested statewide, such as badminton, baseball, field hockey, gymnastics, lacrosse, skiing and snowboarding, soccer, softball, and water polo.

Federated Council
The organization's supreme governing body is the Federated Council. This council consists of one representative from each section, a representative from the California Department of Education, representatives from all bodies recognized as Allied Organizations by the CIF, the Council President, the President-Elect, and the immediate past President. Each representative is elected to a term of two years. The Council meets three times per year.

Allied organizations
The following groups are considered Allied Organization by CIF:
 California Department of Education
 California School Boards Association (CSBA)
 National Federation of State High School Associations (NFHS)
 Association of California School Administrators (ACSA)
 California State Athletic Directors Association (CSADA)
 California Association for Health, Physical Education, Recreation and Dance (CAHPERD)
 California Coaches Association
 Josephson Institute "Character Counts!"
 Positive Coaching Alliance
 Center for Sports Parenting

See also
 NFHS

References

External links
CIF State Official website
San Gabriel Valley Football Officials Association

 
Organizations based in California
Sports organizations established in 1914
1914 establishments in California
California
California